Amanda Jane Solloway (née Edghill, 6 June 1961) is a British politician serving as Lord Commissioner of the Treasury since September 2022. She served as Parliamentary Under-Secretary of State for Equalities and Parliamentary Under-Secretary of State for Safeguarding from July to September 2022. A member of the Conservative Party, she has been the Member of Parliament (MP) for Derby North since 2019, having previously served from 2015 to 2017.

Early life and education
Amanda Jane Edghill was born on 6 June 1961 in Nottingham. She has a younger sister and brother.

She was educated at Bramcote Hills Grammar School in Bramcote, Nottinghamshire, which became comprehensive in 1978.

She started working at the age of 16 behind the counter of an off-licence before working as a management trainee at Sainsbury's supermarket where she stayed for 13 years. Amanda then went on to work in a regional training role at Help the Aged before working for Baird Clothing company as head of training in 1998, and founded her own consultancy in 2008 (which is now dormant due to Parliamentary duties).

Parliamentary career
Solloway was first elected at the 2015 general election for the Derby North constituency, with a majority of 41 votes, unseating the Labour MP Chris Williamson, who had been the MP for the seat since 2010. She became a parliamentary private secretary to the minister of state for the Department of International Development.

Solloway has been a campaigner on mental health and homelessness issues in Derby North and in Parliament.

Solloway lost her seat at the 2017 general election to Williamson, on a night where Labour made gains across the United Kingdom. She continued to be active in Derby North, including in the 2018 Derby City Council election and 2019 Derby City Council election, where the Conservatives made gains in the Derby North constituency wards.

She regained Derby North for the Conservatives at the 2019 general election with a majority of 2,540, with Williamson (standing as an independent) in sixth place.

On 14 February 2020, Solloway was appointed Parliamentary Under Secretary of State for Science, Research and Innovation at the Department for Business, Energy and Industrial Strategy during the first cabinet reshuffle of the second Johnson ministry.

On 17 September 2021, Solloway was appointed a lord commissioner of the Treasury (Government whip) during the second cabinet reshuffle of the second Johnson ministry.

Other work
Solloway spent 15 years in retail management with J Sainsbury supermarket, a further 15 years within human resources in the charity sector (Help the Aged and Save the Children), and in the private sector (Baird Clothing Group) supporting manufacturing, warehousing and retail. 

From 2017 to 2021 Solloway was the sole director and sole shareholder of Amanda Solloway Limited, a management consultancy company, which entered voluntary liquidation in December 2020.

Personal life
Solloway lives in Derbyshire and was patron of the Friends Of The Baby Unit at Royal Derby Hospital. She ran the London Marathon, in 2016 and 2017, and, in doing so, raised money for the hospital's baby unit. She has also served as a School Governor for around 20 years and has been a keen campaigner for mental health issues.

Notes

References

External links 
 
 

21st-century British women politicians
Conservative Party (UK) MPs for English constituencies
Female members of the Parliament of the United Kingdom for English constituencies
Living people
Members of the Parliament of the United Kingdom for constituencies in Derbyshire
People from the Borough of Erewash
Politicians from Nottingham
Politicians from Derby
Politics of Derby
UK MPs 2015–2017
UK MPs 2019–present
British charity and campaign group workers
Mental health activists
1961 births
21st-century English women
21st-century English people